Osmaston is a civil parish in the Derbyshire Dales district of Derbyshire, England.  The parish contains 21 listed buildings that are recorded in the National Heritage List for England.   Of these, one is listed at Grade II*, the middle of the three grades, and the others are at Grade II, the lowest grade.  The parish contains the village of Osmaston and the surrounding area.  The country house, Osmaston Manor, was built in the 1840s, and has been largely demolished, but its gardens and grounds contain listed buildings, including garden features, cottages and boat houses.  The other listed buildings are houses, cottages and associated structures, a church, a school, a war memorial, and a telephone kiosk.


Key

Buildings

References

Citations

Sources

 

Lists of listed buildings in Derbyshire